Jörg Friedrich (born 1951 in Erfurt) is a German architect.

Career 
He received his degree as an architect in 1978 at the University of Stuttgart.  Following collaboration with the architects, Peter Poelzig and Joachim Schürmann in their offices in Berlin and Cologne, he became independent in 1980 with an office in Venice, together with Bernd Sammek, Jürgen Böge and Ingeborg Lindner.
Following his work together with Luitpold Frommel at the Max Planck Institute in Rome 1984/85, Jörg Friedrich established the international office of architecture, pfp-architects, with its headquarters in Hamburg, later also with offices in Genoa and Rome.
Jörg Friedrich assumed the position of lecturer at the History of Arts Institutes at the Universities of Hamburg (1983-1986), of Genoa, of Rome and of Wuppertal. In the year 2005 he became a member of the Evaluation Commission at the Academy of Architecture in Mendrisio.  From 1988 until 2000 as Professor in Hamburg Jörg Friedrich taught courses in Drafting and the History of Architecture.  He received an offer of a professorship in 1992 at the RWTH in Aachen and chaired the departments of Structural Concepts and the Theory of Architecture in 2000 at the Leibniz University in Hanover.  Jörg Friedrich was Chairman of the Department of Architecture at the Free Academy of Arts in Hamburg from 1994 to 1998 where he is yet a member and where he was appointed to the “Committee of the Fritz Schumacher Award” in Hamburg in 2006.  He is a member of the “Dramaturgical Society” as well as of the “Foundation Architectural Art” in Berlin.  In 2013 he was elected Dean of the Leibniz University.

Selected projects 

 2013: Cultural Power Station, central Dresden
 2012: Congress Center, Padua
 2012: Main-Franconia Theater, Würzburg
 2011: Theater, Large Auditorium and Foyer, Düsseldorf
 2010: New Theater Building, Gütersloh
 2010: Construction of New Medical Clinics in Darmstadt’s Hospital Center, including Memorial Site for Former Liberal Synagogue, Darmstadt
 2010: Staatstheater - Schauspielhaus redevelopment, Nuremberg
 2008: Competency Center of the Chamber of Handcraftsmanship, Harburg – Hamburg
 2008: Residential Construction “Bavaria Grounds”, St. Pauli, Hamburg
 2006: Residential Building at Kaiser Quay in Harbour City, Hamburg
 2003: Sports Center and Residential Area in the Lotharinger Strasse, Münster
 2003: Theater Erfurt
 2002: Canteen and Auditorium Maximum, Central University Area, Flensburg
 1998: Officers’ Army Training Academy, Sports Center, Renovation Measures, Dresden
 1997: Nursing Center, Kindergarten and Senior Residence Facilities in „St. Loyen”, Lemgo
 1993: Main Administration Building of the City Works, Witten, Westphalia

Awards 

 2010   BDA Hamburg Prize for Architecture / 1. Prize for the Elbe Campus, Chamber of Handcraftsmanship Hamburg
 2008   BDA Hamburg Prize for Architecture / 3. Prize for residential construction on the Bavaria grounds
 2008   BDA Hamburg Prize for Architecture 2008 in acknowledgement of residential construction in the “Harbor City” at the Kaiser Quay
 2008   1. Prize for the Center of Competency, Chamber of Handcraftsmanship Hamburg (Elbe Campus), Yearbook “Architecture in Hamburg”, distinguished projects 1989-2008
 2007   Architectural and Engineering Association, Hamburg: Building of the Year 2007, award for residential construction at the Bavaria site
 2007   Foundation award 2007 in recognition of the “Living City” project for the Park Terrace in Göhren, Thuringia
 2004   Thüringen State Prize for Architecture and Urban Design in recognition of the Opera / Theater in Erfurt
 2000   Architecture – Art Award, New Saxony Art Association, Dresden
 1997   “Fine Building Distinction” for the administration building in Witten
 1989   Architecture Prize Recklinghausen for Justice Training Academy, North Rhine-Westphalia
 1987   Federal Republic of Germany Award
 1986   The City of Hamburg’s Promotion Prize “Fritz Schumacher Award”
 1984   North Rhine Westphalian Promotion Prize for Young Artists

Exhibitions 

 2007  German Architecture Museum, Frankfurt: New Building Sites, Building in the New Federal States
 2003  Hamburg, Museum of the History of Hamburg, “The Dream of the City on the Sea”  (curator)
 2003  Architectural Summer in Hamburg
 2004  Hanover, A Radical City Vision, Kestner Society
 2005  German Architecture Museum, ”Giuseppe Terragni – Models of a Rational Architecture”  (curator)
 2002  Contribution made to the Venice Biennale of Architecture
 2001  Erfurt, Vision of a Theater
 1998  Aachen: A New Gallery for the Ludwig Collection, Jörg Friedrich: Drafts and Drawings
 1997  Rotterdam: Gallery of the Netherlands’ Architectural Institute
 1994  Hamburg, Architecture Gallery Renate Kammer, Jörg Friedrich: Drafts and Projects
 1987  Rome: Architecture Gallery SALA UNO, Jörg Friedrich: 5 Projects

Selected publications 

 Architecture in Hamburg, Yearbook, Junius Publishing Company, Hamburg (1989, 92-95, 97, 99, 2002–04, 06, 08, 11-12)
 AIT, Architecture, Interior Design, Technical Refinement, Alexander Koch, Berlin 1999, 2012
 Jörg Friedrich – “Theaters”, Ivana Paonessa, Jovis Publishing House, Berlin 2011
 The New Theater Nuremberg, Henschel Publishing Company, Leipzig 2010
 An Adornment of our City, Martin Frenzel, Justus von Liebig Publishers, Darmstadt 2008
 Town Houses, Sybille Kramer, Braun Publishing House, Switzerland 2008
 Plans, Projects, Buildings, Jörn Walter, Braun Publishing House, Switzerland 2005
 FLARE, Architectural Lighting Magazine, n°38, Editrice Habitat, Milan 2005
 The Erfurt Theater, A Space for Visions, Guy Montavon, Erfurt Theater, 2004
 The World of Construction 1996, 2004
 ARC – HH, Architecture Made in Hamburg, Dirk Meyhöfer, Junius Publishing Company, Hamburg 2003
 Radical City Vision, Urban Planning Models for Hanover, Niggli Publishing Company 2002
 Giuseppe Terragni, Models of a Rational Architecture, Niggli Publishing Company, 1999
 Luigi Snozzi, Urban Development, Niggli Publishing Company, 1997
 L’architettura della democrazia (Architecture in a Democracy); ABITARE, Abitrare Segesta Publishers, Milan 1995
 Witten’s main Administration Building, Department of Works, Jörg Friedrich, Ingeborg Flagge, Ernst and Son, Berlin 1994
 CUBE, The Hamburg Magazine for Architecture, Modern Living and Style, b1 Communication GmbH, Düsseldorf

Notes 

1951 births
Living people
20th-century German architects
21st-century German architects